Quentin Marshall Grimes (born May 8, 2000) is an American professional basketball player for the New York Knicks of the National Basketball Association (NBA). He played college basketball for the Kansas Jayhawks and the Houston Cougars.

High school career
Grimes attended The Woodlands College Park High School in The Woodlands, Texas, graduating in 2018. He was the first basketball player in school history to letter on the varsity team and start in all games as a freshman. Over the course of his high school career he earned a weighted 3.38 GPA. During his senior year of high school, Grimes averaged 29.5 points, 8.6 rebounds, 4.9 assists, 1.8 steals, and 1.5 blocks per game, and led the College Park Cavaliers to a 21–13 overall record. He left high school with 2,863 points, 854 rebounds, 582 assists, 213 steals, and 127 blocks in total. Grimes was named the All-Greater Houston Player of the Year, the Gatorade State Player of the Year, and a McDonald's All-American. Just before entering college, he was projected as a top 5 pick in the 2019 NBA draft.

Recruiting
On November 15, 2017, he committed to playing college basketball at the University of Kansas, choosing the Jayhawks over offers from Kentucky, Marquette, Texas, and eight other schools.

College career

Kansas
In his first college game, Grimes had 21 points and six 3-pointers against Michigan State. As a freshman at Kansas, Grimes averaged 8.4 points, 2.5 rebounds and 2.0 assists per game, shooting 34 percent from the 3-point line and 38.4 percent from the field. After the season, he declared for the 2019 NBA draft but withdrew before the deadline and decided to transfer to Houston.

Houston
Grimes was granted a waiver and was eligible to play for Houston immediately instead of sitting out a season. On November 19, 2019, he scored a sophomore season-high 32 points to help beat Rice, 97–89. Grimes scored 21 points and pulled down six rebounds versus Texas State on December 4 and had 24 points and four rebounds in a road victory at South Carolina on December 8. He was named American Athletic Conference (AAC) player of the week on December 9. As a sophomore, Grimes averaged 12.1 points, 2.6 assists, and 3.7 rebounds per game.

On February 25, 2021, Grimes scored a career-high 33 points and made eight three-pointers in an 81–57 win against Western Kentucky. He was selected as AAC tournament MVP after scoring 21 points in a 91–54 win over Cincinnati in the final. He led Houston to the Final Four at the 2021 NCAA tournament. As a junior, Grimes averaged 17.8 points, 2.0 assists, and 5.7 rebounds per game, sharing AAC Player of the Year honors with Tyson Etienne. On April 9, he announced that he would declare for the 2021 NBA draft and forgo his remaining college eligibility.

Professional career

New York Knicks (2021–present)
Grimes was selected with the 25th pick in the 2021 NBA draft by the Los Angeles Clippers and then traded to the New York Knicks. On August 6, 2021, the Knicks announced they signed Grimes. In his first career start, Grimes scored 27 points and made seven three-pointers to go along with three rebounds and three assists in a loss to the Milwaukee Bucks.

Grimes joined the Knicks' 2022 NBA Summer League roster. He and the Knicks made it to the Summer League Championship, but lost to the Portland Trail Blazers with a score of 77–85. Grimes led the Knicks in points, scoring nineteen points. On July 18, 2022, Grimes was named to the All-NBA Summer League First Team.

National team career
Right after graduating from high school, Grimes was selected to represent the United States at the 2018 FIBA Americas U18 Championship for Men in June 2018 as part of the U18 National Team, the USA won gold and Grimes was named MVP.

Career statistics

NBA

|-
| style="text-align:left;"| 
| style="text-align:left;"| New York
| 46 || 6 || 17.1 || .404 || .381 || .684 || 2.0 || 1.0 || .7 || .2 || 6.0
|- class="sortbottom"
| style="text-align:center;" colspan="2"| Career
| 46 || 6 || 17.1 || .404 || .381 || .684 || 2.0 || 1.0 || .7 || .2 || 6.0

College

|-
| style="text-align:left;"| 2018–19
| style="text-align:left;"| Kansas
| 36 || 36 || 27.4 || .384 || .340 || .603 || 2.5 || 2.0 || .6 || .2 || 8.4
|-
| style="text-align:left;"| 2019–20
| style="text-align:left;"| Houston
| 30 || 21 || 27.9 || .443 || .326 || .660 || 3.7 || 2.6 || .8 || .2 || 12.1
|-
| style="text-align:left;"| 2020–21
| style="text-align:left;"| Houston
| 30 || 30 || 32.8 || .406 || .403 || .788 || 5.7 || 2.0 || 1.4 || .3 || 17.8
|- class="sortbottom"
| style="text-align:center;" colspan="2"| Career
| 96 || 87 || 29.3 || .411 || .366 || .701 || 3.9 || 2.2 || .9 || .2 || 12.5

Personal life
Grimes was born on May 8, 2000, to parents Tonja Stelly and Marshall Grimes. His older maternal half-brother, Tyler Myers, is a professional ice hockey defenceman for the Vancouver Canucks of the National Hockey League. The two brothers have never lived together, due to Myers's move to Canada with his father just after Grimes's birth. Grimes and Myers are the first pair of brothers to play in the NBA and NHL.

Off the court, Grimes has volunteered with the Houston-based nonprofit, Play With Purpose, which works with at-risk young people in the area.

References

External links
Houston Cougars bio
Kansas Jayhawks bio
USA Basketball bio

2000 births
Living people
All-American college men's basketball players
American men's basketball players
Basketball players from Texas
Houston Cougars men's basketball players
Kansas Jayhawks men's basketball players
Los Angeles Clippers draft picks
McDonald's High School All-Americans
New York Knicks players
People from The Woodlands, Texas
Shooting guards
Sportspeople from Harris County, Texas